Chen Chien-sheng (born 20 December 1976) is a Taiwanese bobsledder. He competed in the four man event at the 2002 Winter Olympics.

References

1976 births
Living people
Taiwanese male bobsledders
Olympic bobsledders of Taiwan
Bobsledders at the 2002 Winter Olympics
Place of birth missing (living people)